Frederick York Powell (4 January 1850 – 8 May 1904) was an English historian and scholar.

Biography 

He was born on 4 January 1850 at 43 Woburn Place, Bloomsbury, London, the son of Frederick Powell, a commissariat merchant, and his wife Mary Powell, daughter of Dr James Powell. He was educated at the Manor House School at Hastings, and Rugby School. He matriculated at the University of Oxford in 1868 as an unattached student, the following year joining Christ Church, where he took a first-class degree in law and modern history in 1872. Whilst at Oxford, he was a member of the exclusive Stubbs Society.

Powell was called to the bar at the Middle Temple in 1874.

He became law-lecturer and tutor of Christ Church, fellow of Oriel College, delegate of the Clarendon Press, and in 1894 he was made Regius Professor of Modern History in succession to James Anthony Froude. In June 1901 he received an honorary doctorate (LLD) from the University of Glasgow during celebrations for the university's 450th jubilee.

Powell died on 8 May 1904 at Staverton Grange, Banbury Road, Oxford, and was buried in Wolvercote. Part of his collection of artefacts were deposited at the Pitt Rivers Museum.

Associations
Powell took an interest in French poetry, and Paul Verlaine, Stéphane Mallarmé, and Emile Verhaeren all lectured at Oxford under his auspices. He was also a connoisseur in Japanese art. In politics his sympathies were with the oppressed of all nationalities; he had befriended refugees after the Commune, counting among his friends Jules Vallès the author of Les Réfractaires; and he was also a friend of Stepniak and his circle.

Powell was a member of the Folklore Society and became its president in the year that he died. The society's journal, which had published his papers, printed an obituary by Edward Clodd.

Works
Powell's contributions to history were not extensive, but he was a particularly stimulating teacher. He had been attracted in his school days to the study of Scandinavian history and literature, and he was closely allied with Professor Guðbrandur Vigfússon (d. 1889), whom he assisted in his Icelandic Prose Reader (1897), Corpus Poeticum Boreale (1887), and Origines Islandicae (1905), and in the editing of the Grimm Centenary papers (1886).

Family
Powell married in 1874 Florence Batten (née Silke). She died in 1888. They had a daughter, Mariella.

References

External links

Oliver Elton, Frederick York Powell: A Life and Selection from his Letters and Occasional Writings (1906)
 
 
 

Attribution

1850 births
1904 deaths
Alumni of Christ Church, Oxford
19th-century English historians
English socialists
Fellows of Oriel College, Oxford
People educated at Rugby School
People from Bloomsbury
Regius Professors of History (University of Oxford)
Presidents of the Folklore Society